Canal Boat may refer to:
 Barge, a flat-bottomed craft for carrying cargo
 Narrowboat, a specialized craft for operation on the narrow canals of England, Scotland and Wales

See also
 Canal craft, a list of the types of canal craft in the United Kingdom